{{DISPLAYTITLE:C6H10O}}
The molecular formula C6H10O may refer to:

 cis-3-Hexenal
 Cyclohexanone
 Cyclohexene oxide
 Mesityl oxide
 3-Methyl-3-penten-2-one
 Methylpentynol
 Methylene tetrahydropyrane

Molecular formulas